Disciseda is a genus of gasteroid fungi in the family Agaricaceae. It is a widely distributed genus that is prevalent in arid zones. Disciseda was circumscribed by mycologist Vassiliĭ Matveievitch Czernajew in 1845.

Species

, Index Fungorum accepts 36 species in Disceida:

See also
List of Agaricales genera
List of Agaricaceae genera

References

External links

Agaricaceae
Agaricales genera